The 1993 1. divisjon season, the highest women's football (soccer) league in Norway, began on 24 April 1993 and ended on 10 October 1993.

18 games were played with 3 points given for wins and 1 for draws. Number nine and ten were relegated, while two teams from the 2. divisjon were promoted through a playoff round.

Sprint/Jeløy won the league, losing only one game.

League table

Top goalscorers
 26 goals:
  Randi Leinan, Trondheims-Ørn
 18 goals:
  Ann Kristin Aarønes, Trondheims-Ørn
 17 goals:
  Charmaine Hooper, Donn
 14 goals:
  Birthe Hegstad, Sprint/Jeløy
 12 goals:
  Petra Bartelmann, Asker
 11 goals:
  Agnete Carlsen, Sprint/Jeløy
  Katrin Skarsbø, Sprint/Jeløy
 8 goals:
  Linda Medalen, Asker
  Åse Iren Steine, Sandviken
  Renate Walle, Sandviken
 7 goals:
  Gøril Kringen, Trondheims-Ørn

Promotion and relegation
 Grand Bodø and Jardar were relegated to the 2. divisjon.
 Haugar and Molde were promoted from the 2. divisjon through playoff.

References

League table
Fixtures
Goalscorers

Norwegian First Division (women) seasons
Top level Norwegian women's football league seasons
1
Nor
Nor